Vadrevu K. (VK) Raju is a board-certified ophthalmologist.

Born 
Born in Rajumundry, Andra Pradesh, India in 1942.

Education and early career 
Dr. VK Raju earned the following: 
 M.B.B.S. from Andra University 
 D.O. from the University of London
 F.R.C.S from the University of Edinburgh
 F.A.C.S. from the American College of Surgeons
 Board Certified Ophthalmologist- American Board of Ophthalmology

Eye Foundation of America 
In 1977, Dr. VK Raju offered an eye camp near his hometown in rural India; this was the inception of the Eye Foundation of America (EFA). The West Virginia Ophthalmology Foundation was subsequently created in 1982, and became the EFA in 1992. The EFA's mission is to eliminate avoidable blindness under the guiding principles of service, teaching, and research. The EFA helped build two hospitals in rural India: the Srikiran Eye Institute, and the Goutami Eye Institute.

Honors

Raju has received many honors and awards.

 Susruta Lecture at Wilmer Eye Institute, Johns Hopkins University, 2019. 
 Lifetime Achievement Award, North American Telugu Society, May 2019. 
 American Society of Cataract and Refractive Surgery Foundation Certificate of Recognition for Chang Humanitarian Award, 2019.
 Rangaraya Medical College Certificate of Appreciation on the occasion of Rangaraya Medical College Diamond Jubilee, Kakinada, AP, 2019 
 Honors by Vice President of India, M. Venkiah Naidu, on the occasion of Rangaraya Medical College Diamond Jubilee, Kakinada, AP, 2019 
 American Society of Cataract and Refractive Surgery Foundation Certificate of Recognition for Chang Humanitarian Award, 2018.
 Community Service Award from Member of Congress, New York, 2017.
 Indian American Press Club Humanitarian Award, New York, 2017
 Certificate of Recognition from American Society of Cataract & Refractive Surgery Foundation, 2017.
 Lifetime Achievement Award from West Virginia State Medical Association 2017.
 The University of Toledo Global Medical Missions Hall of Fame Class of 2017 Inductee; April 1, 2017
 The President's Lifetime Achievement Award, from President Barack Obama, 2016.
 New York State Assembly Citation; December 13, 2016
 Pravasi Rattan Award – Gold Medal from NRI Welfare of Society of India; Washington, DC 2015
 Presidential Award AAPI (American Physicians of Indian Origin); Orlando, FL 2015
 Gold Medal Award International Academy for Advances in Ophthalmology, Bombay Ophthalmologists Association;  Mumbai, India 2014
 Mahatma Gandhi Pravasi Samman Award for Achievement in Medicine, House of Lords, London; 2014
 Paul Harris Society, Rotary International 2014
 Gold Medal Oration at Vijayawada Academy of Ophthalmology  2014
 Leading Physicians of the World; International Association of Ophthalmologist, 2014
 MedScape:  Best Doctors in America 2013
 AMA Foundation Nathan Davis Excellence in Medicine International Award 2013
 Guest of Honor, GITAM University, Visakhapatnam, AP, India 2012
 Rameshwar Sharma MD Gold Medal Oration, Indian Academy of Medical Sciences, Rajasthan Chapter 2012
 Guest of Honor, All Indian Ophthalmology Society Meeting, Cochin 2012
 Gold Medal from the President, All Indian Ophthalmology Society Meeting, Cochin 2012
 American Academy of Ophthalmology Senior Achievement Award, 2011
 Paul Harris Fellow, Rotary International, 2008
 Martin Luther King Jr Achievement Award, WVU, 2008
 Distinguished Community Service Award, American Association of Physicians of Indian origin, 2007
 Honorable mention, American Medical Association Foundation 2006 
 Pride of the Pride Award, Lions International District 29, 2005
 Best of the Show Award, Film presented at American Academy of Ophthalmology Annual Meeting, 2004
 Veda Vyasa Sabha Trust, Chennai, Honorary Title of Vaidya Ratna, 2003.
 Vaidya Ratna (conferred by Sankaracharya of Kanchi, India) 2002
 House of Delegates, Legislative Citation, State of West Virginia, 2002
 Lifetime Achievement Award, American Association of Ophthalmologists of Indian Origin, Oct. 2002
 Outstanding Humanitarian Award, American Academy of Ophthalmology, Oct. 2002
 Dr. Hardia Gold Medal for Best Paper on Refractive Surgery, All Indian Ophthalmology Society, Ahmedabad, Jan. 2002
 AP (India) Gold Medal for Contributions to Advance Ophthalmology, 2001
 AAPI (American Association of Physicians of Indian Origin, Maryland Chapter) Honors, 2001
 Melvin Jones Fellow: Lions Club International Foundation, 2001
 Guest of Honor, Rajasthan State Ophthalmic Society, 2000
 Rotary International (Morgantown) Honor Award, 2000
 Major S. Dutt Memorial Medal, Ophthalmology Society of West Bengal, 1997
 Achievement Award, American Academy of Ophthalmology, 1996
 ATA (American Telugu Association) American Telugu Association Award, 1996
 Lions Club International (Morgantown) Jarrett Award, 1995
 West Virginia University International Service Award, 1995
 HHH (Heart & Hand for the Handicapped, New Jersey) Outstanding Heart Award, 1994 & 1995
 TANA Award (Telugu Association of North America) for Outstanding Achievement in Medicine, 1993
 AP State of Ophthalmology Society Gold Medal, 1983
 Lions (India) Award of Service for the Blind, 1979
 Jaycees (Vijayawada, India) Award of Service for the Blind, 1977
 

1. Musings on Medicine, Myth, and History: India's Legacy, VK Raju, 2017
 
2. AMA Honors Dr. Raju with  the American Medical Foundation Nathan Davis Excellence in Medicine International Award, Feb 2013

3. Dr. Raju inducted into University of Toledo College of Medicine and Life Science’s Global Medical Missions Hall of Fame, 2017

4. Lifetime Achievement Award from North America Telugu Society

5. AAPI Collaboration with Dr. VK Raju and the Eye Foundation of America

6. Physician Dedicated to Eliminating Preventable Blindness- EyeWorld, 2014

American ophthalmologists